The 2015 Fort Worth mayoral election took place on May 9, 2015, to elect the Mayor of Fort Worth, Texas. The election was held concurrently with various other local elections, and is officially nonpartisan.

The mayoral term in Fort Worth is two years. Incumbent Mayor Betsy Price, a Republican who was first elected in  2011, ran unopposed for a third term.
 
If more than two candidates had filed, and had no candidate received a majority of the vote in the general election, a runoff would have been held on June 13.

Candidates
 Betsy Price, incumbent Mayor

General election

Results

References

2015 Texas elections
2015 United States mayoral elections
2015
Non-partisan elections